A Brazilian Love Affair is the fifteenth studio album by American keyboardist and record producer George Duke. It was released in 1980 through Epic Records. Recording sessions for the album took place from March 1979 to April 1979 at Level E Hawai Recording Studio in Rio de Janeiro and at Westlake Recording Studios with additional recording at Le Gonks West Studio in West Hollywood, California. It was mastered by Brian Gardner at Allen Zentz Recording Studio in Los Angeles.

Duke used various keyboard instruments for A Brazilian Love Affair, including Rhodes piano, Sequential Circuits Prophet-5, Oberheim polyphonic, Minimoog, ARP Odyssey, Yamaha CP-70. The album features guest appearances from Brazilian jazz musicians, such as vocalists Flora Purim, Milton Nascimento and Simone, guitarist Toninho Horta, drummer Robertinho Silva, and percussionist Airto Moreira, along with Duke's frequent collaborators: Lynn Davis, Jerry Hey, Larry Williams, Sheila Escovedo, Roland Bautista and others.

In the United States, the album peaked at #119 on the Billboard 200 and at #40 on the Top R&B/Hip-Hop Albums chart. It reached #33 in the UK Albums Chart. Its single, the title song "Brazilian Love Affair", peaked at #36 in the UK.

Track listing

Personnel 

 George Duke – vocals (tracks: 1, 7), synthesizers (tracks: 1-3, 5-10), lead vocals (tracks: 2, 9), bells (track 2), electric pianos (tracks: 2, 7), acoustic piano (tracks: 4, 8), vibraphone (tracks: 5, 9)

Vocalists

 Lynn Blythe Davis – vocals (tracks: 2, 9)
 Josie James – vocals (tracks: 2, 9)
 Lúcia Maria Werner Vianna Lins – vocals (tracks: 3, 8)
 Flavio Faria – vocals (tracks: 3, 8)
 Zéluiz – vocals (tracks: 3, 8)
 Simone Bittencourt de Oliveira – lead vocals (track 9)
 Lúcia Maria Turnbull – vocals (track 3)
 Flora Purim – vocals (track 5)
 Milton Nascimento – vocals and acoustic guitar (tracks: 3, 10)

Instrumentalists

 Antônio Maurício Horta de Melo – acoustic guitar (tracks: 2, 5), electric guitar (tracks: 3, 10)
 Roland Bautista – guitar (track 1), electric guitar (tracks: 4, 6-9)
 Byron Lee Miller – bass (tracks: 1-2, 6-9)
 Jamil Joanes – bass (tracks: 3, 5, 10)
 Ricky Lawson – drums (tracks: 1, 6, 7, 9)
 Robertinho Silva – drums (tracks: 2, 3, 5, 8, 10), agogô (tracks: 3, 8), caxixi and talking drum (track 3), tambourine (track 8)
 Airto Moreira – percussion (tracks: 1, 10), surdo & tambourine (track 8)
 Chico Batera – percussion (tracks: 2, 5), congas and triangle (tracks: 3, 8), ganzá & reco-reco (track 3), bongos and tambourine (track 8), castanets (track 10)
 Sheila Escovedo – timbales (tracks: 6, 9), bongos and chimes (tracks: 7, 9), cowbell (track 7), caxixi (track 9)
 Larry Williams – tenor saxophone (track 2), alto saxophone (track 6)
 Jerry Hey – flugelhorn (tracks: 2, 10), trumpet (track 6)
 Bill Reichenbach, Jr. – trombone (tracks: 2, 6)
 Raul de Souza – trombone (track 5)
 Murray Adler – strings (track 10)

Production

 George Duke – producer, arrangements
 Kerry McNabb – engineer
 Mitch Gibson – assistant engineer
 Erik Zobler – assistant engineer
 Andy Mills – assistant engineer
 Jorge Luiz – assistant engineer
 Brian Gardner – mastering
 Bruce Heigh – production manager
 Julie Sayres – coordinator
 Vania Toledo – photography

Chart history

References

External links 

1979 albums
Albums produced by George Duke
Epic Records albums
George Duke albums
Jazz-funk albums